Honolii Stream is a stream located on the Island of Hawai'i. It rises on the upper eastern slope of Mauna Kea and empties in the Pacific Ocean near Hilo.

References

Bodies of water of Hawaii (island)
Rivers of Hawaii